Maishofen is a municipality in the district of Zell am See (Pinzgau region), in the state of Salzburg in Austria.

Population

References

Cities and towns in Zell am See District